Arroxo is one of thirteen parishes (administrative divisions) in Quirós, a municipality within the province and autonomous community of the Principality of Asturias, in northern Spain.

The population is 68 (INE 2111).

Villages 
 Arroxo
 El Barón
 El Castañeo
 El Quintanal
 La Fábrica
 San Pedro
 San Salvaor
 Veiga
 Viḷḷagondú

Small towns

References 

Parishes in Quirós